John Solomon may refer to:

Sports
John Solomon (Australian footballer) (born 1928), Australian rules footballer for St Kilda
John Solomon (croquet player) (1931–2014), croquet player from England
John Solomon (rower) (1903–1981), New Zealand Olympian
John Solomon (rugby union) (1929–2020), Australia international rugby union captain

Others
John Solomon (Canadian politician) (born 1950), Canadian politician and public servant
John Solomon (political commentator) (active 1987 to present), American journalist and media executive
John Solomon (writer) (born 1970), American comedian and comedy writer
John R. Solomon (1910–1985), Canadian Liberal-progressive politician

See also
Jon Solomon, DJ
Jack Solomon, American sound engineer